Ken Harper (27 April 1924 - December 2010) was an English professional footballer who played as a centre half, making one appearance in the Football League between 1950 and 1951 for Shrewsbury Town.

References

1924 births
2010 deaths
English footballers
Blackpool F.C. players
Rochdale A.F.C. players
Shrewsbury Town F.C. players
English Football League players
Association football defenders